The Osh (Odnomotornyi Shturmovik – single-engined attack) was an attack aircraft designed in the USSR from  1939.

Development 
In 1930 the LIIPS ( - Leningrad institute for sail and communications engineers) formed a UK GVF ( - training centre for civil air fleet), in turn the UK GVF formed the NIAI (Naoochno-Issledovatel'skiy Aero-Institoot - scientific test aero-institute) which became the focus of several good design engineers who were given command of individual OKB (Osboye Konstrooktorskoye Byuro – personal design/construction bureau).

Anatolii Georgievich Bedunkovich designed a large single-engined twin-boomed attack aircraft during 1939, to be constructed from stressed skin light-alloy. This large aircraft was to carry a heavy cannon armament including a turret in the rear of the fuselage nacelle, which also housed the single engine, driving propellers in the nose of each tail-boom, through shafts and gearboxes. There is no record of this interesting project having been built or flown.

See also

References

 Gunston, Bill. “The Osprey Encyclopaedia of Russian Aircraft 1875 – 1995”. London, Osprey. 1995. 

1930s Soviet fighter aircraft